Holly Lapsley Fletcher (born 7 August 1996), known by the stage name Låpsley, is an English singer, songwriter, musician and producer. Her debut album Long Way Home was released on 4 March 2016.

Early life
Låpsley was born in York. Her middle name, Lapsley, is her mother's maiden name. She changed "Lapsley" to "Låpsley" by adding the Scandinavian character Å, partly due to her perceived ties with Scandinavia through her Scottish heritage, as well as how it looked when written. She grew up in Southport, Merseyside, where she attended Greenbank High School and Formby High School for sixth form.

Career

2013–present 
Having been a member of several bands in the Merseyside area, Låpsley won the "One to Watch" prize at Merseyside's GIT (Getintothis) Award in April 2014, following over half a million listens of her solo bedroom-recorded Monday EP on SoundCloud. She played the BBC Introducing stage at Glastonbury Festival in June 2014, having been championed by BBC Radio 1 DJ's Huw Stephens and Zane Lowe. Her track Painter (Valentine) was playlisted by BBC Radio 1 in September 2014 and received daytime airplay.

Låpsley signed with XL Recordings in October 2014. On 30 November 2014, Låpsley was revealed as one of acts on the BBC Sound of...2015 long list. Her Understudy EP was released on 5 January 2015. Her debut album, Long Way Home, was released on 4 March 2016. She performed at Lollapalooza in July 2016.

In April 2016, she was picked as Elvis Duran's Artist of the Month and was featured on NBC's Today show hosted by Kathie Lee Gifford and Hoda Kotb, broadcast nationally, where she performed live her single "Love Is Blind". In 2016, the track "8896" by Låpsley was included in the sound track of American Honey, directed by Andrea Arnold. In the same year, track "Falling Short" was included in season one of Harlan Coben's The Five (TV series), during the final scene of episode 4, directed by Mark Tonderai.

Personal life
Låpsley enjoys yachting and owns a boat called Theodore. On 28 June 2020, she came out as bisexual in an Instagram post. In exchanges on Instagram, Låpsley has stated that she is studying Politics, Philosophy and Economics (PPE) at Goldsmiths University.

Discography

Albums

Extended plays

Singles

Music videos

Awards and nominations

Notes

References

External links
Official website

1996 births
Living people
English electronic musicians
English women singer-songwriters
Musicians from Southport
English women in electronic music
XL Recordings artists
21st-century English women singers
Bisexual songwriters
Bisexual singers
Bisexual women
English LGBT singers
English LGBT songwriters
Art pop musicians
20th-century LGBT people
21st-century LGBT people